The Pebble Beach Concours d'Elegance is an automotive charitable event held each year on the Pebble Beach Golf Links in Pebble Beach, California. It is widely considered the pinnacle event of its kind and one of the most prestigious car events in the world. 

It is the finale of Monterey Car Week held in August every year. A Concours d'Elegance (French, literally "a competition of elegance") is an event open to both prewar and postwar collector cars in which they are judged for authenticity, function, history, and style. Classes are commonly arranged by type, marque (manufacturer), coachbuilder, country of origin, or time period. Judges select first-, second-, and third-place finishers for each class in the event, and the judges confer the pinnacle "Best of Show" award on one car from the group of first-place winners. 

In addition, a group of honorary judges—individuals who have made significant contributions to the automotive industry or motorsports—award a number of subjective awards to recognize standout vehicles regardless of class ribbons, as well as memorial awards created to honor specific automotive industry personages.  Approximately 15,000 spectators attend the event.

Dozens of world-renowned luxury and hypercar brands use the event to officially debut new models and showcase their future concept cars, with many of the participating manufacturers having their own temporary display building for the duration of the event.

History

The Pebble Beach Concours d'Elegance was founded in 1950 as an adjunct to the Pebble Beach Road Race, a race event sponsored by the Sports Car Club of America and conducted on a circuit of closed public roads. The 1950 and 1951 Concours were held on a practice tee and driving range adjacent to the Beach Club, a private club near the Del Monte Lodge (now known as "The Lodge at Pebble Beach"). Thirty cars were exhibited on November 4, 1950, and a smaller field of 23 on May 27, 1951. In 1952, the event was moved to the 18th green of the Pebble Beach Golf Links, between the Lodge at Pebble Beach and the Pacific Ocean, overlooking Carmel Bay.

The Pebble Beach Concours d'Elegance has continued since 1950 with one missed year: in 1960, the show was cancelled due to scheduling conflicts. In addition, heavy rain at the event in 1963 and 1965 made the lawn area unusable, and so the cars were shown at the old start/finish line of the road race, near the horse stables now known as the Pebble Beach Equestrian Center.

In 2001, the event saw an introduction of a new category for preservation cars. This category was designed to "bear witness to the passage of time", including the so-called barn find car.The 2006 event saw 175 cars lining the 18th green and hole of Pebble Beach Golf Links with 25 judged classes, with cars brought to Pebble Beach from 27 states and 13 countries (including the U.S.). The event describes itself as "Exhibiting prewar and postwar automobiles along with the latest in concept car designs, the Pebble Beach Concours d'Elegance is the premiere concours in the world."

24 of the 175 cars in the field come from outside the U.S, representing Italy, England, France, Switzerland, Australia, China, Germany, Mexico, Czech Republic, Netherlands, and the Philippines. The total estimated cost of the vehicles spread across the 18th fairway at the 2006 event was US$200 million. From 227 cars in 2005, the 2006 event had a field reduced to 175 cars.  Organizers said the change was made to allow more time to judge each car.

In 2009, the Pebble Beach Concours included classic motorcycles for the first time under the theme of pre-1959 British Motorcycles.

The Concours received the 2011 Motoring Event of the Year award by the International Historic Motoring Awards.

With the 2020 event being scrapped by the COVID-19 pandemic, the 70th was deferred to 2021.

Each year's Pebble Beach Concours honors a featured marque (manufacturer), coachbuilder, or type.   A cottage, or mansion industry has sprung up to support what has long since become more properly a janitorial d'elegance, having little to do with the genuine European events of the 1930s.

The competitive field

Prospective entrants must submit an application for each car, and the Concours field is selected from each year's pool of applicants. Many collectors spend years and hundreds of thousands of dollars purchasing and restoring a car in hopes of being chosen. Once a car is accepted to the Concours, it cannot again be entered in the event for ten years, with three exceptions; the ownership of the car has changed, the car has been restored, or if the featured marque is obscure, the Concours car selection committee can reach out to invite cars of varying restoration quality—or cars that have previously been entered in the Concours—in order to provide a healthy representation of the marque for exhibition.

Many of the competing cars are valued in the hundreds of thousands of dollars, and more recently into the millions of dollars. For this reason, along with its remarkable setting and amenities, the Pebble Beach Concours is considered the premier concours in the world, and is the centerpiece of over 50 related events spanning over a week, including vintage racing cars running at the Rolex Monterey Motorsports Reunion (formerly called the Monterey Historic Automobile Races) conducted at nearby WeatherTech Raceway Laguna Seca, as well as classic car auctions.

Due to the extreme cost of purchasing, restoring, and maintaining fine classic cars, the Pebble Beach Concours is understandably the province of silver spooners, shopping mall developers, 2019's Best of Show winner owned by a Hong Kong billionaire, if drawing the merely wealthy, and dedicated enthusiasts and those individuals and businesses that cater to their interests. To the repeat participants, their guests, and thousands of attendees, the Pebble Beach Concours is as much a social gathering as a special interest event. From postwar Ferraris to historic Bentleys, the Concours assembles a stylish mix of historic automobiles alongside new vehicle presentations from car manufacturers, art exhibitions, auctions, and charity raffles.

Elegance Awards 

 J.B. & Dorothy Nethercutt Most Elegant Closed Car
 Gwenn Graham Most Elegant Convertible 
 Jules Heumann Most Elegant Open Car
 Strother MacMinn Most Elegant Sports Car

Other Awards

Gran Turismo Award

Since 2008, Japanese-American Kazunori Yamauchi and the president of Polyphony Digital, creator of the Gran Turismo series, has presented the Gran Turismo Award to the participant vehicle that stands out as exemplary among the competition, whether it be due to rarity, quality of restoration, or stunning appearance. The owners of the winning vehicle are then offered the opportunity to have their car featured in the Gran Turismo series. Yamauchi is also an honorary judge for the main awards.

In 2021, the Gran Turismo Award went to a 1969 Ferrari 512 S Berlinetta once driven by Jacky Ickx and John Surtees owned by Swiss-based Frenchman Pierre Mellinger.

The French Cup
This award, established in the 1980s (unknown year), is given to, as the name says, a car of French origin considered the most significant. In 2021 the award went to a 1937 Delahaye 135 M Chapron Cabriolet owned by Tom McGough Sr. and Tom McGough Jr. of North Oaks, Minnesota.

Best of Show winners 

As of 2021, J.B. Nethercutt has the most individual victories at 6 while Bugatti and Mercedes-Benz are tied as the most successful marquees at 9 wins each.

Charitable performance
The proceeds of the Pebble Beach Concours d'Elegance have supported the United Way of Monterey County and the Pebble Beach Company Foundation for a combination of 56 years. It also supports a number of other local and national organizations.

The 2016 event raised over $1.75 million, and the Concours has given more than $23 million to charities through the years.

References

External links
The Pebble Beach Concours d'Elegance official website
Pebble Beach Concours in Perspective — one view of why Pebble Beach is the most important Concours d'Elegance. Denise McCluggage. MSN autos.
World's Finest Cars, Smithsonian Networks

Concours d'Elegance
Recurring events established in 1950
Auto shows in the United States
Charity events in the United States
Tourist attractions in Monterey County, California
1950 establishments in California
Pebble Beach, California
Annual events in California
Events in the Monterey Bay Area